Claire Louise Rushbrook (born 25 August 1971) is an English actress. She is best known for her role as Roxanne in Secrets & Lies.

Early life
Claire Louise Rushbrook was born on 25 August 1971 in Hitchin, Hertfordshire. She attended Fearnhill School in Letchworth, Hertfordshire, before joining Rose Bruford College.

Career
Rushbrook worked mainly in theatre for around five years before moving into film and television. She guest starred in the episodes "The Impossible Planet" and "The Satan Pit" in Doctor Who and had supporting roles in films Secrets & Lies and Spice World. Her Doctor Who guest star status earned her a position in a Doctor Who celebrity edition of The Weakest Link but ended up being the fourth one voted off. She also appeared in the 2008 BBC comedy drama Mutual Friends and the 2009 ITV1 dramas Whitechapel and Collision, both alongside Phil Davis.

Rushbrook's theatre credits include West End productions of Three Sisters as Olga and Festen as Helene. Other stage roles include Mary Warren in The Crucible (Sheffield Crucible theatre), Sonia in Uncle Vanya (Almeida Theatre), Mum in Market Boy (National Theatre) and Maggie in Middle (National Theatre). 

Her films include Mike Leigh's Secrets & Lies (1996) and Carine Adler's Under the Skin (1997) with Samantha Morton. On television, she has starred in The Sins (2000), Linda Green (2001–02), the sitcom Carrie And Barry (2004–05), Whitechapel (2009–13) and My Mad Fat Diary (2013–15), for which she received a 2014 BAFTA TV Award nomination for Best Supporting Actress, and Home Fires (2015–16). In 2020 she appeared in Enola Holmes (as Mrs Lane) and Ammonite. In 2021 she starred opposite Adeel Akhtar in the British film Ali & Ava.

Filmography

Film

Television

Radio

References

External links

1971 births
People from Letchworth
People educated at Fearnhill School
Alumni of Rose Bruford College
Living people
English television actresses
English film actresses
Actresses from Hertfordshire
20th-century English actresses
21st-century English actresses